German submarine U-487 was a Type XIV supply and replenishment U-boat ("Milchkuh") of Nazi Germany's Kriegsmarine during World War II.

Her keel was laid down 31 December 1941 by Germaniawerft in Kiel as yard number 556. She was launched on 17 October 1942 and commissioned on 21 December 1942 with Oberleutnant zur See Helmut Metz in command. Metz commanded the boat for its entire career.

Her service began with training as part of the 4th U-boat Flotilla. She then joined the 12th flotilla for operations.

Design
German Type XIV submarines were shortened versions of the Type IXDs they were based on. U-487 had a displacement of  when at the surface and  while submerged. She had two shafts and two propellers.

U-487 was not fitted with torpedo tubes or deck guns, but had two  SK C/30 anti-aircraft guns with 2500 rounds as well as a  C/30 guns with 3000 rounds. The boat had a complement of fifty-three.

Operational career
U-487 conducted two patrols. As a supply boat, she avoided combat.

First patrol
The U-boat departed Kiel on 27 March 1943, heading for the mid-Atlantic. She arrived in Bordeaux, in occupied France on 12 May.

Second patrol and loss
Her second patrol saw her leave Bordeaux on 15 June 1943. On 13 July, U-487 was attacked in the central Atlantic by five United States Navy Grumman TBF Avengers and Grumman F4F Wildcats from the escort carrier . The U-boat's crew were taken by surprise, so much so that sunbathers were seen on the casing. One Wildcat was shot down, but 31 men were killed and the U-boat sunk. The 33 survivors were taken prisoner on board .

References

Bibliography

External links
 

German Type XIV submarines
U-boats commissioned in 1942
U-boats sunk in 1943
World War II submarines of Germany
1942 ships
World War II shipwrecks in the Atlantic Ocean
Ships built in Kiel
U-boats sunk by US aircraft
Maritime incidents in July 1943